Unbalance Unbalance is a Korean manhwa series written by Dall-Young Lim and illustrated by Soo-Hyun Lee. The series focuses on Jin-Ho Myung, a slacker student in his last year of high school, and Hae-Young Nah, a beautiful young woman in her mid-twenties who is revealed to be Jin-Ho's homeroom teacher. The story focuses on the ongoing romantic relationship between the two, as well as other relationships with other girls in Jin-Ho's life as the story progresses.

Unbalance Unbalance began biweekly serialization in Daewon C.I.'s Young Champ magazine on May 30, 2005. The first bound volume was  released in South Korea on June 25, 2005 under their Young Comics imprint, and sold ten volumes until January 13, 2012, spanning 82 chapters throughout its run. The series had a long hiatus following the release of the ninth volume, and resumed serialization in Young Champ from October 5, 2010 to October 1, 2011. The manhwa was licensed in North America by Infinity Studios, and released two volumes of the series between January 11, 2007 and December 12, 2007 prior to its closure. 

Unbalance Unbalance has been licensed for international releases in a number of languages. It is licensed in France by Tokebi, in Hong Kong, Macau and China by Asia Comics, in Russia by Comics Factory, and in Japan by Kill Time Communications, where it was serialized in Comic Valkyrie. Japanese releases of the series feature unique cover art and uncensored scenes, as well as being localized to better suit Japanese readers. Individual chapters of the series are called Touches.


Volumes list

References

External links
 

Lists of manhwa chapters